"Hot" is a song by American singer Pia Mia released on July 24, 2020, by Republic Records and Electric Feel Entertainment. The song follows Mia's previous single, "Princess", and serves as the second single from Mia's upcoming debut studio album. A remix of the song featuring Sean Paul and Flo Milli was released on October 27, 2020.

Background and composition 

Pia Mia first revealed the title of the song in an interview with Idolator, revealing it would be the next single to be released from her upcoming album after "Princess". Pia Mia shared a snippet of the song on July 18, 2020, on her social media. She later revealed the cover art of the song three days before its release.

Music video 
In an interview with Wonderland Magazine, Pia revealed that a "visualiser" for the song was shot by a local team in Guam, whilst an official music video will later be shot in Los Angeles. On September 6, 2020, Pia Mia announced via her social medias that the visualiser for "HOT" will be released on September 9. The visualizer was released exclusively through Pia Mia's OnlyFans page on September 9, before being uploaded publicly on YouTube on September 14.

Critical reception 
Evan Real of Billboard praised the song stating that the song features, "shimmering vocals, seductive lyrics and an island-tinged beat that will send fans straight to the (socially-distanced) dance floor". Wonderland Magazine called the song "a sizzling, sun-soaked summer bop, with the mileage to follow suit of 'Do It Again'".

Remix 

On October 25, Pia Mia announced the Hot (Remix) on her social medias featuring Sean Paul and an unannounced artist. The unknown feature was later revealed to be American rapper Flo Milli and was announced alongside the release of the song on October 27, 2020.

Music video 
A visualizer for the remix featuring Sean Paul and Flo Milli was released on October 30.

References

2020 singles
2020 songs
Pia Mia songs
Flo Milli songs
Sean Paul songs
Song recordings produced by the Roommates
Songs written by Ben Billions
Songs written by MNEK